The Leigh Academy is a state funded academy for the Dartford area of Kent, England. It is part of the Leigh Academies Trust. The academy's principal, also serving as CEO of the trust, is Simon Beamish; he succeeded Frank Green as the principal when it was designated a City Technology College from 1997 to 2007. Prior to 1997, the Leigh was called the Downs School.

History
Dartford East Secondary Modern School was built in the 1920s as two schools for boys and girls on both sides of Green Street Green Road on East Hill in Dartford. The name was changed to the Downs Secondary Modern School for Boys, and the Downs Secondary Girls School and then just The Downs. The girls school was rebuilt in the 1960s, by Howard Lobb and Partners for Kent County Council. Greenstraete indicates the site of an overgrown Roman road.

The Leigh Academy occupies the former site of the Downs secondary school. In 1990 it became the Leigh City Technology College, when it opened as one of the original 15 City Technology Colleges.  In September 2007, The Leigh became an academy.  In May 2013, the Academy's Ofsted ratings were reduced from outstanding to good.

Academy
In January 2008 students and staff moved into the new school. The official opening of the academy took place on 20 June 2008, led by Lord Coe.

The academy is split into five colleges: Shakespeare, Seacole, Curie, Mandela and Attenborough. Each College has its own Head of College and Assistant Head of College.

Leigh Academies Trust

The Leigh Academy is part of Leigh Academies Trust.

References

External links
 

Leigh City Technology College
Dartford
Secondary schools in Kent
Academies in Kent
Leigh Academies Trust
Educational institutions established in 2007
2007 establishments in England